This list of libraries in New Zealand includes libraries operated by territorial authorities, universities, central government and the private sector, as well as public and community libraries.

References
 Directory of New Zealand Libraries 

 
New Zealand
Libraries
Libraries